Lead citrate is a compound of lead and citrate that is primarily used as an enhancer for heavy metal staining in electron microscopy.  This salt binds to osmium and uranyl acetate and enhances contrast in many cellular structures.  Lead citrate is highly reactive with carbon dioxide.

References

 Lead compounds
Citrates